Tele2 Arena is a multi-purpose stadium in Stockholm Globe City, located in Johanneshov, just south of Stockholm City Centre, Sweden, that was open in July 2013. The following is a complete list of all events that have been or will be held at the arena. In addition, the stadium is used as the home venue of the football teams Djurgårdens IF and Hammarby IF.

2013

2014

Sources
 Tele2 Arena official site
 Swedish Football Association
 Swedish Bandy Association

References

Lists of events in Sweden
Culture in Stockholm
Tourist attractions in Stockholm
Lists of events by venue